Furcacaudidae is a family of thelodontid agnathan from the Lower Devonian. It is the type family of the order Furcacaudiformes.

References

External links 

 

Devonian jawless fish
Thelodonti
Prehistoric jawless fish families
Early Devonian first appearances
Early Devonian extinctions